Vlaşca may refer to the following places in Romania:

Vlașca (river), a tributary of the Teslui in Dolj County
Vlașca County, a former county in southern Muntenia
Vlașca, a village in Fetești city, Ialomița County
Drăgănești-Vlașca 
Dărăști-Vlașca, a village in Adunații-Copăceni Commune, Giurgiu County

See also
Vlaška (disambiguation)
Vlaško Polje
Vlašić (disambiguation)